Czechoslovakia competed at the 1992 Winter Paralympics in Tignes/Albertville, France. 16 competitors from Czechoslovakia won 6 medals, 4 silver and 2 bronze, and finished 14th in the medal table.

See also 
 Czechoslovakia at the Paralympics
 Czechoslovakia at the 1992 Winter Olympics

References 

Czechoslovakia at the Paralympics
1992 in Czechoslovak sport
Nations at the 1992 Winter Paralympics